The 184th Ohio Infantry Regiment, sometimes 184th Ohio Volunteer Infantry (or 184th OVI) was an infantry regiment in the Union Army during the American Civil War.

Service
The 184th Ohio Infantry was organized at Camp Chase in Columbus, Ohio September through October 1864 and mustered in for one year service on February 1, 1865, under the command of Colonel Henry S. Commager.

The regiment left Ohio for Nashville, Tennessee, February 21; then moved to Chattanooga and to Bridgeport, Alabama, March 21. Guarded the railroad bridge over the Tennessee River at Bridgeport, and also the railroad between Bridgeport and Chattanooga, Tennessee, with frequent skirmishes with Rebel cavalry and guerrillas, March 21 through July 25. Served garrison duty at Edgefield, Tennessee, July 25 through September 20, 1865.

The 184th Ohio Infantry mustered out of service September 20, 1865, at Nashville, Tennessee, and was discharged at Camp Chase on September 27, 1865.

Casualties
The regiment lost a total of 60 men during service; 1 enlisted man killed, 1 officer and 58 enlisted men due to disease.

Commanders
 Colonel Henry S. Commager

See also

 List of Ohio Civil War units
 Ohio in the Civil War

References
 Dyer, Frederick H. A Compendium of the War of the Rebellion (Des Moines, IA:  Dyer Pub. Co.), 1908.
 Ohio Roster Commission. Official Roster of the Soldiers of the State of Ohio in the War on the Rebellion, 1861–1865, Compiled Under the Direction of the Roster Commission (Akron, OH: Werner Co.), 1886–1895.
 Owens, Ira S. Greene County Soldiers in the Late War (Dayton, OH:  s.n.), 1884.
 Reid, Whitelaw. Ohio in the War: Her Statesmen, Her Generals, and Soldiers (Cincinnati, OH: Moore, Wilstach, & Baldwin), 1868. 
Attribution

External links
 Ohio in the Civil War: 184th Ohio Volunteer Infantry by Larry Stevens
 National flag of the 184th Ohio Infantry
 Regimental flag of the 184th Ohio Infantry

Military units and formations established in 1865
Military units and formations disestablished in 1865
Units and formations of the Union Army from Ohio
1865 establishments in Ohio